Miss Philippines Earth 2011 was the 11th edition of the Miss Philippines Earth pageant. It was held on June 5, 2011 in Puerto Princesa, Palawan, Philippines with 10 finalists competed in the finale and was telecast on ABS-CBN at 10:00 pm and The Filipino Channel and was shown internationally via The Filipino Channel.

The pageant had aligned itself with the "International Year of the Forests" as it centered this year's pageant edition with the promotion of forests conservation.

Miss Philippines Earth 2010 winner Kris Psyche Resus crowned Athena Mae Imperial from Casiguran, Aurora as her successor. Imperial represented the Philippines in the international Miss Earth 2011 beauty pageant and won Miss Earth Water 2011.

Aside from the Miss Philippines Earth 2011 grand title, four other titles of equal importance and with the same rank were crowned. Tarhata Clio Shari Rico was crowned Miss Philippines Eco Tourism 2011, Michelle Gavagan won Miss Philippines Fire 2011, Murielle Adrienne Orais received the Miss Philippines Water 2010, and Jonavi Raisa Quiray was crowned Miss Philippines Air 2011.

Results
Color keys

Notes: 
 Since 2009, the four elemental court of the Miss Philippines Earth winner, namely Miss Philippines- Air, Miss Philippines- Water, Miss Philippines- Fire, and Miss Philippines Eco-Tourism were all equal winners and the remaining five finalists who failed to advance in the top five were the runners up of the pageant.

Special awards

 Major Special Awards
 Minor/Sponsor Special Awards

Candidates
The following is the list of the 49 official contestants of Miss Philippines Earth 2011 representing various cities, municipalities, and Filipino communities abroad:

Notes:
 The first elimination round took place on 6 May 2011. There were eight candidates eliminated and forty remained in the contest.
 The second elimination round took place on 12 May 2011. There were ten candidates eliminated and thirty remained in the contest.
 The third elimination round took place on 16 May 2011. There were ten candidates eliminated and twenty remained in the contest.
 The fourth elimination round took place on 21 May 2011. There were ten candidates eliminated and the top 10 finalists were chosen.

Judges
The following is the list of the panel of judges that selected the winners of Miss Philippines Earth 2011:

References

External links
 Miss Philippines-Earth official website

2011
2011 beauty pageants
2011 in the Philippines